Kieler Street (Norwegian: Kielergata) is a Norwegian ten-part television crime series, which premiered on October 18, 2018 on TV 2 and TV 2 Sumo. It was created by Stig Frode Henriksen, Jesper Sundnes and Patrik Syversen. It was directed by Syversen and Cecilie A. Mosli. The main protagonist, Jonas Schulman (Thorbjorn Harr) is a former criminal who had started a new life and new identity in the fictional small town of Slusvik. Andrea Bræin Hovig portrays his wife, Elin and Ylva Fuglerud acts as his stepdaughter, Sofie. When a friend confronts Jonas about his secret past, he suspects blackmail, kills the friend and struggles to maintain his "normal life" façade. The series was mainly filmed in Fetsund, Ørje and Aurskog.

The series was nominated for four awards ahead of Gullruten 2019: best drama series, best actor (Harr), best clip, TV drama (Erlend Mjømen Knudsen) and best sound design (Megaphon: Erling Rein and Petter Clausen). In Australia it was broadcast via SBS-TV from February 4, 2021.

Plot 

Jonas wants to live a quiet life in Slusvik, a small Norwegian town near the Swedish border. His wife Elin is a school teacher and her teenage daughter, Sofie, is bored and disgruntled. Jonas' neighbour, Geir, an insurance assessor proposes a business deal – blackmail people who have something to hide. Jonas suspects Geir wants to blackmail him and snaps Geir's neck. Jonas dismembers the body and buries it in the woods. While there he loses Sofie's pet cat, Kasper. The townspeople believe Geir abandoned his wife and ran off. Flashbacks show Jonas as Stefan: a criminal, his gang robs a security van. Stefan kills the driver and then his gang leader, Cato. Later he uses the money to buy a new identity from a shady organisation, Omega. In Slusvik Sofie has trouble with local bully Elisabeth: they fight. Meanwhile a nude teen girl's body is found in the town's sluice gate. After another fight with Elisabeth, Sofie joins the drama club to avoid expulsion from school. The drama club practices a play on the town's pioneer, Haakon.

Several months later Sofie still hunts the woods for Kasper and finds a bloodied running shoe, which belongs to the dead girl. Jonas fears a thorough search could find Geir's body parts, so he digs them up to take them to a factory. Another neighbour, William, sees Jonas and manipulates him to help interfere with local police looking into the dead girl. Marius, a national investigator, is dispatched to Slusvik to head the search for her killer. He stirs up the press and eventually focuses on William as fitting the profile of a psychopath. Jonas and William decide to divert the blame onto Adam, Sofie's drama teacher. Adam and the drama students hike to an isolated cabin for a weekend to focus on their play. Jonas had followed along and, heavily disguised, accosts Adam and accuses him of pedophilia. He warns Adam to leave the locals girls alone. Adam is distraught and becomes increasingly withdrawn. Jonas and William decide to kill Adam but make it look like suicide.

Cast 

 Thorbjorn Harr as Jonas Schulman/Stefan, former criminal, later a restaurant waiter
Kristoffer Joner was originally cast as Jonas but had to resign due to an injury.
 Andrea Bræin Hovig as Elin Müller Schulman, Løkkebakken High School teacher, Jonas' wife
 Ylva Fuglerud as Sofie Müller Schulman, student, Elin's teenage daughter, Jonas' step-daughter, her pet cat Kasper is missing
  as Geir Gregersen, an insurance assessor, Jonas' neighbour, investigates locals he suspects of hiding something, killed by Jonas but officially assumed to have left town
 Sigurd Myhre as William Schmidtberger/Philip, former real estate embezzler, later a call centre worker, recent Slusvik arrival, coerces Jonas to help stall any murder investigation
 Janne Heltberg at Barbara, Elin's neighbour, married to Geir who disappears
 Benjamin Helstad as Adam Solvang/the Bag Man, drama teacher, folk singer-songwriter
 Alexandra Rapaport as Nina Novak/Alina, former abused wife of an Eastern European crime boss, later house-bound with obvious plastic surgery
 Ole Thore Hasseldal as Haakon Walter, historical figure, Slusvik pioneer, also an anti-Semite and misogynist
 Ingrid Bolsø Berdal as "Iris", works for Omega, interviews subjects prior to placement
 Silje Storstein as Vigdis Walter, Slusvik police, descendant of Haakon
  as Lydia Bjerch-Andersen, Slusvik senior police, Vigdis' boss
 Nader Khademi as Kai Kolstad, local photographer-news reporter
 Johan Rheborg as Øystein Superbroa, restaurant owner, Jonas' boss
 Jenny Strøm Bjørntvedt as Elisabeth Kjeldsen, student, Sofie's bully and rival
 Henrik Dieter Stenholt as Niklas, student, bully who becomes Sofie's love interest
 Susanne Karin Moe as the dead girl, mid-teens Eastern European
 Kyrre Haugen Sydness as Ronald Lund, Slusvik mechanic, finds dead girl near the town's sluice gate
 Nicolai Cleve Broch as Marius Borge, National Crime Unit murder investigator, struggles to find the dead girl's killer, becomes Barbara's love interest
 Anneke von der Lippe as Henriette Maeir, veterinarian, blamed by Sofie for losing Kasper
  as Kjell-Vidar Ormåsen, Christian, married to Beate, Ruben's dad
 Cecilie A. Mosli as Beate Ormåsen, Christian, married to Kjell-Vidar, Ruben's mom
 Lene Marie Hegge as Wanda, student, drama club member
  as Amalie Melhus, Slusvik mayor, wants to maintain its image as the safest town in Scandinavia
 Stig Frode Henriksen as Cato, criminal gang leader, Stefan's boss, Natasja's boyfriend
 Pihla Viitala as Natasja, criminal gang member, Cato's girlfriend, Stefan's secret lover
  as Rannveig Didriksen, Løkkebakken school principal, places troublesome students into drama club

Notes

Episode guide

References 

Television shows set in Norway
2018 Norwegian television series debuts
2010s Norwegian television series
Norwegian crime television series